Apostasy is a 1948 Japanese drama film directed by Keisuke Kinoshita, based on the novel The Broken Commandment by Tōson Shimazaki.

Plot
Segawa, a young rural school teacher in the Meiji era, hides his burakumin roots, as he had promised his father, who had hoped for his son a life without social rejection. His promise conflicts with his wish to confess his secret to his fiancée Oshiho. Oshiho's father and Segawa's mentor Kazama, ancestor of an old samurai family, has just been forced to retire for plain monetary reasons, thus losing his pension. After prominent burakumin writer Inoko, whom Segawa met with, is killed by a group of villagers, rumours about Segawa's descent are spreading. Put under pressure at a public meeting of the town's people, he finally reveals the truth. With the majority turning against him, including his former mentor, he is forced to resign. Upon leaving the town together with Oshiho, who decided to stay by his side, he is waved good-bye by his single loyal colleague Tsuchiya and the town's children.

Cast
Ryō Ikebe as Segawa
Yōko Katsuragi as Oshiho
Osamu Takizawa as Inoko
Jūkichi Uno as Tsuchiya
Eitarō Ozawa as Takayanagi
Ichirō Sugai as Kazama
Chieko Higashiyama

Awards
 Mainichi Film Award for Best Director for the films Apostasy, Woman and The Portrait

References

External links

1948 films
1948 drama films
Japanese drama films
1940s Japanese-language films
Japanese black-and-white films
Films based on Japanese novels
Films directed by Keisuke Kinoshita